Tshering Wangdi is a Bhutanese former international footballer who last played for Yeedzin. He made his first appearance for the Bhutan national football team in 2011.

References

Bhutanese footballers
Bhutan international footballers
Living people
Transport United F.C. players
Yeedzin F.C. players
People from Chukha District
Association football midfielders
Year of birth missing (living people)